"The Bewitchin' Pool" is the 156th and last episode of the first incarnation of the American anthology television series The Twilight Zone. ("Come Wander with Me", however, was the final episode to be filmed.) It originally aired on June 19, 1964 on CBS.

Opening narration
Right before the end of the introduction, as in a typical episode, Rod Serling appears on-screen and says:

After the opening credits are finished rolling, Serling, in voice-over, says:

Plot
Sport Sharewood and her younger brother Jeb live in a large, expensive house, but their parents are cold, ill-tempered, self-centered, and constantly bickering with each other.

While Sport and Jeb are sitting beside their swimming pool, Whitt, a young boy in a straw hat, pops up from the deep end of the pool and invites them to follow him. The children dive underwater only to come back up in a swimming hole bordering a rustic, simple homestead. An assortment of children are playing in the yard. In contrast to their lavish home of neglect and insults, they are welcomed and loved from the moment they arrive at this humble children's paradise. There is only one adult there, "Aunt T.", a kind and patient elderly woman who loves children. She explains that she has many children there who came from parents who did not deserve them.

Sport and Jeb go home, for fear that their parents will be worried. "Aunt T" advises them that they likely will not be able return as few children can find their way back. But Jeb later returns to Aunt T's, and Sport is sent by her mother to go and find him because she has something to tell them about some decisions that are made that will make all their lives better.  Sport finds Jeb at Aunt T's but he refuses to go back. Sport convinces him by telling him that their mother has promised everything will be better; he reluctantly agrees to return with her.  Back home their parents inform them they are planning to divorce and they must decide which parent they will live with. The children refuse and dive back into the pool, and are able to escape. When they do not reemerge, their father jumps in to rescue them, but discovers they have disappeared. Sport and Jeb are now happily living with Aunt T. Sport hears the distant voice of her mother, but ignores it and focuses on her new life.

Closing narration

Cast
 Mary Badham as Sport Sharewood
 June Foray as dubbed voice of Sport Sharewood, in outdoor scenes only
 Jeffrey Byron (as Tim Stafford) as Jeb Sharewood
 Kim Hector as Whitt
 Georgia Simmons as Aunt T
 Dee Hartford as Mrs. Gloria Sharewood
 Tod Andrews as Mr. Gil Sharewood

Episode notes
This was the final episode of the original Twilight Zone series to be broadcast, though not the last to be filmed. The last episode filmed was "Come Wander with Me", while, according to Marc Scott Zicree's "The Twilight Zone Companion", the reediting of An Occurrence at Owl Creek Bridge (including the addition of new footage of Serling) was the last episode "produced" before cancellation. The last episode broadcast during the original run – as a repeat – was "The Jeopardy Room".

Numerous production problems delayed the premiere of this episode, which was originally scheduled for March 20, 1964. Most noticeably, back-lot noise rendered much of the outdoor dialogue unusable – only the indoor scenes with Aunt T were considered audible. The entire cast (except Aunt T) consequently re-dubbed their outdoor dialogue in September 1963, but Mary Badham's voice was still deemed not right. Unfortunately, by the time this decision had been made, Badham had returned to her home in Alabama, and the cost of flying her back to Los Angeles to re-record her lines yet again was ruled to be too expensive.  Eventually, voice actress June Foray, best known as the voice of Rocky the Flying Squirrel in the Bullwinkle cartoons, dubbed Sport Sharewood's lines for all the scenes that take place outdoors. In the finished episode, the change in Sport's voice is noticeable when she moves indoors, and Badham's own deeper voice and more authentic accent are heard in place of Foray's overdubbed voice characterization.

Another production peculiarity is that "The Bewitchin' Pool'" is the only episode of The Twilight Zone to open with a teaser scene that is repeated in its entirety later in the episode. This opening teaser scene (which is well over two minutes in length) was not included in Earl Hamner's original episode script; it appears to have been included to lengthen the episode after some other footage was dropped. Note that actor Harold Gould is listed in some sources as a cast member for this episode, but does not appear in any capacity in the finished production. (In one account, Gould is given credit for having played a radio announcer, but there is no radio announcer in the actual completed episode.)

Other re-used footage in the episode includes an identical 10-second shot of Sport and Jeb swimming up to the foot of a tree on two occasions; Sport and Jeb's mother twice telling them in the space of a minute "Darn you loudmouth kids" – using exactly the same footage of her dialogue, as well as of the kids' reaction; and the first and final shots of various children playing in front of Aunt T's house.

Earl Hamner, Jr., got the idea for "The Bewitchin' Pool" while living in the San Fernando Valley region of California and witnessing an alarming divorce rate and the effect it had on children. The episode was one of the first shows on television to really address the problem of divorce and bad parenting, and in part it represents wish fulfillment or escapism for children in such situations.

References

Bibliography
DeVoe, Bill. (2008). Trivia from The Twilight Zone. Albany, GA: Bear Manor Media. 
Grams, Martin. (2008). The Twilight Zone: Unlocking the Door to a Television Classic. Churchville, MD: OTR Publishing. 
Presnell, Don and Marty McGee. (2008). A Critical History of Television’s The Twilight Zone, 1959–1964. Jefferson, NC: McFarland.

External links

 

1964 American television episodes
The Twilight Zone (1959 TV series season 5) episodes
American television series finales